Patrick McClure (27 March 1908 – 1 December 1965) was an Irish water polo player. He competed in the men's tournament at the 1928 Summer Olympics.

References

1908 births
1965 deaths
Irish male water polo players
Olympic water polo players of Ireland
Water polo players at the 1928 Summer Olympics
Place of birth missing